Andrea Merenda (born 10 June 1977 in Milan) is an Italian football midfielder who currently plays for Marconi Stallions in the NSW Premier League.

Biography
Merenda had been in training with the Mariners for a month before earning his shot at the Hyundai A-League, having most recently completed the 2007/08 Italian Serie C1 campaign with Calcio Lecco, an historic club from the north of Italy once coached by Roberto Donadoni.

Born in Milan, Merenda came to Australia seeking a fresh challenge after 16 seasons in his home country that included stints at nine clubs across various divisions – peaking with six seasons in the third-tier Serie C1, a division that once pitted Merenda against current Qantas Socceroo Carl Valeri.

Equally at home in defence or midfield, Merenda was introduced to the yellow and navy set up as short-term cover for injured attacking ace Ahmad Elrich. Merenda's signing, albeit on a short-term basis, was a significant one for the Mariners, who until his capture had yet to engage the services of a foreign player from abroad. He was released after failing to break into the first team.

References

External links
 Central Coast Mariners profile

1977 births
Living people
Footballers from Milan
Italian footballers
Italian expatriate footballers
Mantova 1911 players
S.S.D. Pro Sesto players
A.C. Belluno 1905 players
Casale F.B.C. players
Calcio Lecco 1912 players
Central Coast Mariners FC players
Italian expatriate sportspeople in Australia
Association football midfielders